Gotti is an Italian surname.

Geographical distribution
As of 2014, 57.2% of all known bearers of the surname Gotti were residents of Italy (frequency 1:9,415), 11.4% of France (1:51,278), 9.8% of India (1:692,297), 5.5% of the United States (1:574,326), 4.9% of Brazil (1:364,549), 2.6% of Argentina (1:160,690), 1.5% of Switzerland (1:48,306) and 1.3% of Tanzania (1:342,499).

In Italy, the frequency of the surname was higher than national average (1:9,415) in the following regions:
 1. Lombardy (1:1,980)
 2. Emilia-Romagna (1:5,881)
 3. Friuli-Venezia Giulia (1:9,093)

People with the surname
 Francesco Gotti (born 1923), Italian rower
 Gene Gotti (born 1946), American mobster
 Giovanni Gotti (1912–1988), Italian racing cyclist
 Girolamo Maria Gotti (1834–1916), Italian cardinal of the Roman Catholic Church
 Ivan Gotti (born 1969), Italian professional cyclist
 John Gotti (1940–2002), American mobster and former boss of the Gambino crime family
 John A. Gotti (born 1964), American mobster and former boss of the Gambino crime family
 Kebo Gotti (born 1985), American rapper
 Laura Gotti (born 1991), Italian long-distance runner
 Luca Gotti (born 1967), Italian footballer
 Massimo Gotti (born 1986), Italian footballer
 Peter Gotti (1939–2021), American mobster and former boss of the Gambino crime family
 Renato Gotti (born 1964), former Italian long-distance runner
 Richard G. Gotti (born 1967), American mobster
 Richard V. Gotti (born 1942), American mobster
 Victoria Gotti (born 1962), American writer and reality television personality
 Vincenzo Ludovico Gotti (1664–1742), Italian cardinal and theologian of the Roman Catholic Church
 Vincenzo Gotti ( 1580–1636), Italian painter of the Baroque period

See also
Gotti (disambiguation)

References

Italian-language surnames